Special Assignment is an investigative current affairs programme on SABC. Since August 1998 the programme has covered news events in South Africa and beyond, often disclosing criminal activities and atrocities unknown to the public. Ashraf Garda is the shows current host. The Show is screened weekly on SABC 3 at 21:30 GMT.

Awards
Six Avanti Awards in 1999.

References

External links
SABC official website
Special Assignment programme official website

South African television news shows
South African Broadcasting Corporation television shows
1990s South African television series
2000s South African television series
2010s South African television series
1998 South African television series debuts